Roderick Dwayne Coleman (born August 16, 1976) is a former American football defensive tackle who played nine seasons in the National Football League (NFL).  He played college football at East Carolina University.  He was drafted by the Oakland Raiders in the fifth round of the 1999 NFL Draft, and has also played for the NFL's Atlanta Falcons and New Orleans Saints.

Early years
Coleman attended Simon Gratz High School in Philadelphia, where he won varsity letters in football and track and field and was an honor student.

College career
Coleman played for the East Carolina Pirates football team while playing for the East Carolina University. He is the school's career, single-season, and single-game leader in sacks.

Professional career

Oakland Raiders
Coleman played for the Oakland Raiders from 1999 to 2003.

Atlanta Falcons
Coleman signed with the Atlanta Falcons for the 2004 season and played for them until 2007. On February 15, 2008, the Falcons released him.

New Orleans Saints
After sitting out the 2008 season recovering from injuries, Coleman was signed by the New Orleans Saints to a one-year contract on March 27, 2009. He was waived on August 31.

References

External links
New Orleans Saints bio

1976 births
Living people
Players of American football from Mississippi
Players of American football from Philadelphia
American football defensive tackles
National Conference Pro Bowl players
East Carolina Pirates football players
Oakland Raiders players
Atlanta Falcons players
New Orleans Saints players